Robert Lee Smith (born May 18, 1942) is a former American football halfback.

After playing college football at North Texas State, he was drafted in 1964 by both the American Football League (AFL)'s Buffalo Bills and the National Football League (NFL)'s Pittsburgh Steelers. He chose to play for the Bills, and in his rookie season he averaged 4.9 yards per attempt. He won two consecutive American Football League Championships in 1964 and 1965 with the Bills, before leaving the AFL for the NFL. He joined the Steelers for the 1966 NFL season and played a single season in Pittsburgh.

See also
List of American Football League players

References

1942 births
Living people
American football halfbacks
American Football League All-Star players
American Football League players
Buffalo Bills players
North Texas Mean Green football players
Pittsburgh Steelers players